"Girl from Ipanema Goes to Greenland" is the second single from the album Bouncing Off the Satellites by American new wave band The B-52's. The single peaked at No. 10 on the Billboard Hot Dance Club Play, their fourth Top 10 entry on that chart. It was one of the last songs that guitarist and founding member Ricky Wilson recorded with the band before his death. The song title refers to Antonio Carlos Jobim's 1963 hit song "The Girl from Ipanema".

Track listing
 "Girl from Ipanema Goes to Greenland" (Extended Mix) – 8:56
 "Girl from Ipanema Goes to Greenland" (Single edit) – 3:58
 "Girl from Ipanema Goes to Greenland" (12" Mix) – 7:05
 "Girl from Ipanema Goes to Greenland" (Dub) – 7:02

Track 1 remixed by Shep Pettibone.
Tracks 3 and 4 remixed by The Latin Rascals.

Charts

References

1986 singles
The B-52's songs
Songs written by Keith Strickland
Songs written by Cindy Wilson
Song recordings produced by Tony Mansfield
Warner Records singles